Mégantic was a federal electoral district in the province of Quebec, Canada, that was represented in the House of Commons of Canada from 1867 to 1935, and from 1949 to 1968.

History
It was created by the British North America Act, 1867. It was abolished in 1933 when it was redistributed into the Lotbinière and Mégantic—Frontenac electoral districts.

The riding was created again in 1947 from Lotbinière and Mégantic—Frontenac, was defined to consist of:
 the county of Mégantic, (except the municipalities of Nelson, Ste-Anastasie-de-Nelson and the village of Lyster), the city of Thetford Mines and the town of Black Lake;
 that part of the county of Frontenac included in the municipalities of Courcelles, St-Vital-de-Lambton, St-Evariste-de-Forsyth, St-Méthode-de-Frontenac and the villages of Lambton and St-Evariste-Station;
 that part of the county of Wolfe included in the municipalities of Garthby, Stratford, Wolfestown, D'Israeli, Ste-Praxède and the villages of Beaulac and D'Israeli, together with that part of the municipality of Saints-Martyrs Canadiens included in the township of Garthby.

In 1952, it was redefined to consist of 
 the county of Mégantic, (except the township municipality of Nelson, the municipality of Sainte-Anastasie-de-Nelson and the village municipality of Lyster), the city of Thetford-Mines and the town of Black Lake;
 that part of the county of Frontenac included in the municipalities of Lambton, Saint-Evariste-de-Forsyth, Sainte-Méthode-de-Frontenac, the parish municipality of Courcelles and the village municipalities of Lambton and La Guadeloupe;
 that part of the county of Wolfe included in the township municipalities of Garthby, Stratford and Wolfestown, the municipality of Disraeli, the parish municipality of Sainte-Praxède, the village municipalities of Beaulac and Disraeli, together with that part of the parish municipality of Saints-Martyrs Canadiens included in the township of Garthby.

It was abolished in 1966 when it was redistributed into Compton, Frontenac and Richmond.

Members of Parliament

This riding elected the following Members of Parliament:

Election results

Mégantic, 1867–1935

Mégantic, 1949–1968

See also
List of Canadian federal electoral districts
Past Canadian electoral districts

External links
Riding history from the Library of Parliament:
1867-1933
1947-1966

Former federal electoral districts of Quebec